The 2021–22 NC State Wolfpack men's basketball team represented North Carolina State University during the 2021–22 NCAA Division I men's basketball season. The Wolfpack were led by fifth-year head coach Kevin Keatts and played their home games at PNC Arena in Raleigh, North Carolina as members of the Atlantic Coast Conference (ACC).

The Wolfpack finished the season 11–21 overall and 4–16 in ACC play to finish in fifteenth place.  As the fifteenth seed in the ACC tournament, they lost to Clemson in the First Round.  They were not invited to the NCAA tournament or the NIT.

Previous season
In a season limited due to the ongoing COVID-19 pandemic, the Wolfpack finished the 2020–21 season 14–11, 9–8 in ACC play to finish in ninth place. In the ACC tournament, they lost to Syracuse in the first round. They received an at-large bid to the National Invitation Tournament as the third seed in the Colorado State bracket. The Pack defeated Davidson in the first round before losing to Colorado State in the quarterfinals.

Offseason

Departures

Incoming transfers

2021 recruiting class

Roster

Schedule and results

|-
!colspan=12 style=| Exhibition

|-
!colspan=12 style=| Regular season

|-
!colspan=12 style=| ACC Tournament

Source

Rankings

^Coaches did not release a Week 1 poll.

References

NC State Wolfpack men's basketball seasons
NC State
NC State Wolfpack men's basketball
NC State Wolfpack men's basketball